Patricia Hilliard may refer to:

 Patricia Robertson, American astronaut
 Patricia Hilliard (actress), British actress